Dominic Adrian Clapp (born 25 May 1980) is an English cricketer. He played for Sussex and Hampshire in 2002 and 2003 respectively.  He is a former captain of Sussex Cricket League side Worthing Cricket Club.

Having played in the Second XI Championship for Sussex since 1999, and attempting to make his way into the first team, Clapp made his name as a sturdy opening batsman along with teammate Wasim Khan. His form in the competition remained strong throughout his five years at the Second XI level.

Clapp made several appearances for Hampshire in the second team between 2000 and 2003. In 2004 he attempted to make a comeback, playing for Kent Second XI, but playing time remained limited and he has not played first-class cricket since.

External links
Dominic Clapp at Cricket Archive 
Dominic Clapp at Cricinfo

1980 births
English cricketers
Sussex cricketers
Hampshire cricketers
Living people
Sussex Cricket Board cricketers